Wilcox County is a county located in the central portion of the U.S. state of Georgia. As of the 2020 census, the population was 8,766. The county seat is Abbeville.

History 
Wilcox County was formed on December 22, 1857, from parts of Irwin, Pulaski, and Dooly counties. The county was named for General Mark Wilcox, a Georgia state legislator and one of the founders of the Georgia Supreme Court.

The first county courthouse was built in 1858; the present courthouse dates from 1903.

Geography

The northern and eastern three-quarters of Wilcox County, from State Route 215 southeast to Rochelle, then due south, are located in the Lower Ocmulgee River sub-basin of the Altamaha River basin. The southwestern portion of the county, west of Rochelle, and roughly centered on Pitts, is located in the Alapaha River sub-basin of the Suwannee River basin.

Adjacent counties
 Pulaski County - north
 Dodge County - east
 Telfair County  - east
 Ben Hill County - south
 Turner County - southwest
 Crisp County - west
 Dooly County - northwest

Major highways

  U.S. Route 129
  U.S. Route 280
  State Route 11
  State Route 30
  State Route 90
  State Route 112
  State Route 159
  State Route 215
  State Route 233
  State Route 257

Demographics

2000 census
As of the census of 2000, there were 8,577 people, 2,785 households, and 1,977 families living in the county.  The population density was 23 people per square mile (9/km2).  There were 3,320 housing units at an average density of 9 per square mile (3/km2).  The racial makeup of the county was 62.61% White, 36.21% Black or African American, 0.09% Native American, 0.16% Asian, 0.01% Pacific Islander, 0.48% from other races, and 0.43% from two or more races.  1.62% of the population were Hispanic or Latino of any race.

There were 2,785 households, out of which 32.50% had children under the age of 18 living with them, 52.10% were married couples living together, 15.00% had a female householder with no husband present, and 29.00% were non-families. 26.70% of all households were made up of individuals, and 13.30% had someone living alone who was 65 years of age or older.  The average household size was 2.55 and the average family size was 3.09.

In the county, the population was spread out, with 22.80% under the age of 18, 9.60% from 18 to 24, 31.20% from 25 to 44, 22.80% from 45 to 64, and 13.50% who were 65 years of age or older.  The median age was 37 years. For every 100 females there were 123.70 males.  For every 100 females age 18 and over, there were 131.00 males.

The median income for a household in the county was $27,483, and the median income for a family was $34,968. Males had a median income of $27,171 versus $20,366 for females. The per capita income for the county was $14,014.  About 16.80% of families and 21.00% of the population were below the poverty line, including 29.80% of those under age 18 and 21.30% of those age 65 or over.

2010 census
As of the 2010 United States Census, there were 9,255 people, 2,891 households, and 2,027 families living in the county. The racial makeup of the county was 61.7% white, 35.1% black or African American, 0.5% Asian, 0.2% American Indian, 1.6% from other races, and 1.0% from two or more races. Those of Hispanic or Latino origin made up 3.7% of the population. In terms of ancestry, 11.1% were American, 10.1% were Irish, 9.2% were English, and 6.1% were German.

Of the 2,891 households, 32.9% had children under the age of 18 living with them, 49.2% were married couples living together, 15.7% had a female householder with no husband present, 29.9% were non-families, and 25.9% of all households were made up of individuals. The average household size was 2.50 and the average family size was 3.00. The median age was 39.7 years.

The median income for a household in the county was $30,784 and the median income for a family was $40,552. Males had a median income of $30,755 versus $26,641 for females. The per capita income for the county was $12,692. About 18.4% of families and 25.5% of the population were below the poverty line, including 40.6% of those under age 18 and 24.9% of those age 65 or over.

2020 census

As of the 2020 United States census, there were 8,766 people, 2,575 households, and 1,807 families residing in the county.

Education 
The county is served by Wilcox County Schools. The district headquarters are in Abbeville and the schools, including Wilcox County High School, are in Rochelle.

Notable event
The Ocmulgee Wild Hog Festival takes place in Abbeville annually on the Saturday before Mother's Day.

Communities

Cities
 Abbeville
 Pitts
 Rochelle

Town
 Pineview

Census-designated place
 Seville

Politics

See also

 National Register of Historic Places listings in Wilcox County, Georgia
List of counties in Georgia

References

External links 
 Official website of Wilcox County
 Wilcox County Schools website

 
Georgia (U.S. state) counties
1857 establishments in Georgia (U.S. state)
Populated places established in 1857